Rochester Sentinel is the name of a number of current and former newspapers. These include:

 The Rochester Sentinel, a newspaper based in Rochester New York since 1858
 The Rochester Sentinel, a 1910s American-American special interest newspaper, based in Rochester New York,  featuring the work of F. Grant Gilmore.
 The Rochester (Ind.) Sentinel, a newspaper based in Indiana, owned by Paxton Media Group since 2019.

References